Glenfoot railway station was a temporary terminus that served the town of Tillicoultry, Clackmannanshire, Scotland in 1851 on the Devon Valley Railway.

History 
The station opened on 3 June 1851 by the Devon Valley Railway. It was a short-lived terminus, closing on 22 December of the same year when the Tillicoultry Viaduct opened.

References

External links 

Disused railway stations in Clackmannanshire
Railway stations in Great Britain opened in 1851
Railway stations in Great Britain closed in 1851
1851 establishments in Scotland
1851 disestablishments in Scotland